Vibius Sequester (active in the 4th or 5th century AD) is the Latin author of lists of geographical names.

Work 
De fluminibus, fontibus, lacubus, nemoribus, gentibus, quorum apud poëtas mentio fit is made up of seven alphabetical lists of geographical names mentioned by poets, especially Virgil, Ovid and Lucan.

Several of the names do not appear in our copies of the poets; unless this is the result of carelessness or ignorance by the compiler, he must have had access to sources no longer extant.

The lists are:
 Flumina (rivers/waterways)
 Fontes (springs)
 Lacus (lakes)
 Nemora (forests)
 Paludes (marshes)
 Montes (mountains)
 Gentes (peoples)

The work was mainly copied by Italian humanists in the second half of the 9th century. 

The work is best known for preserving a dactylic pentameter line quoted from Cornelius Gallus, uno tellures dividit amne duas ("[the Scythian Hypanis] with its one stream divides two lands"), which was the only known fragment of Gallus's poetry before the discovery in 1978 of several additional lines by him on an Egyptian papyrus.

Editions 
 Older editions include those published in Toulouse (1615); Rotterdam (1711); Paris (1843), and, by Conrad Bursian, Zürich (1867). The text is also in Alexander Riese's Geographi Latini minores (1878). See also Teuffel, History of Roman Literature (Eng. trans., 1900), 445, 1.
 Newer editions include the Teubner edited by R. Gelsomino (1967) and the edition of P.G. Parroni (Milan, 1965).
 Online: 
 Online: p. 145-159 of Alexander Riese, ed. (1878), Geographi Latini Minores, Heilbronn, available at Google Books or the Internet Archive.

References 

 Pier Angelo Perotti, "Note a Vibio Sequestre," Giornale italiano di filologia 56 (2004) 87–99.

4th-century Romans
5th-century Romans
4th-century Latin writers
5th-century Latin writers
Vibii
4th-century geographers
5th-century geographers